Pinogana District is a district (distrito) of Darién Province in Panama. The population according to the 2000 census was 12,823; the latest estimate (for 2019) is 26,160. The district covers a total area of 4,901 km². The capital lies at the town of El Real de Santa María.

Administrative divisions
Pinogana District is divided administratively into the following corregimientos:

El Real de Santa María
Boca de Cupe
Paya
Pinogana
Púcuro
Yape
Yaviza
Metetí

Note: - The indigenous comarca of Wargandi lies within Pinogana District; although it constitutes administratively and independently as a separate corregimiento).

References

Districts of Darién Province